Amiriyeh (also Romanized as Amīrīyeh) is a village in Poshtkuh Rural District, in the Central District of Firuzkuh County, Tehran Province, Iran. At the 2006 census, its population was 461, in 124 families.

References 

Populated places in Firuzkuh County